Calisto Bertramo (28 August 1875 – 30 September 1941) was an Italian stage and film actor. Bertramo appeared in around twenty films and frequently on the stage. He played a leading role in the 1923 London staging of The Lady from the Sea.

Selected filmography
 Messalina (1924)
 Paradise (1932)
 Cardinal Lambertini (1934)
 Adam's Tree (1936)
 Thirty Seconds of Love (1936)
 The Make Believe Pirates (1937)
 It Was I! (1937)
 Mad Animals (1939)
 Heartbeat (1939)
 One Hundred Thousand Dollars (1940)
 A Romantic Adventure (1940)

References

Bibliography 
 Wearing, J.P. The London Stage 1920-1929: A Calendar of Productions, Performers, and Personnel. Rowman & Littlefield, 2014.

External links 
 

1875 births
1941 deaths
Italian male film actors
Italian male silent film actors
Italian male stage actors
Actors from Turin
20th-century Italian male actors